Hugo Hernán Patiño García (September 13, 1966 in Caicedonia – February 21, 1995 in Manizales) was a male road cyclist from Colombia, who was a professional from 1989 to 1995.

Career

1992
3rd in General Classification Clasica Coljueces Cundinamarca (COL)
1993
1st in Stage 7 Vuelta a Colombia (COL)
1994
2nd in Clásica Santander (COL)
1st in Stage 3 Clásico RCN (COL)

References
 

1966 births
1995 deaths
Sportspeople from Valle del Cauca Department
Colombian male cyclists
Vuelta a Colombia stage winners